Events from the year 1616 in Quebec.

Events
Samuel de Champlain returns to Quebec after having (involuntarily) spent the winter in a Wendat camp. He had been injured in late 1615 in a battle between the Iroquois and a combined French-Wendat force.
Jean Nicolet is employed by the Companie des Marchants to travel to Quebec. His journey is to be delayed by two years.

Births
Charles Albanel, Jesuit priest and explorer in New France (died 1696).
March 9 - Robert Giguère, pioneer in New France and founder of Sainte-Anne-de-Beaupré (died 1709)

Deaths

References

1610s in Canada
Quebec, 1616 In
Years in Quebec